Janice Josephs (born 31 March 1982 in Cape Town) is a South African heptathlete turned long jumper.

She finished nineteenth at the 2004 Summer Olympics and fifth at the 2006 Commonwealth Games, the latter in a personal best score of 6181 points. On the regional level she won a silver medal at the 2004 African Championships and the gold at the 2006 African Championships. At the 2007 All-Africa Games she only entered the long jump competition, which she won with a new personal best of 6.79 metres. She did not reach the final at the 2007 World Championships, but finished eighth at the 2008 World Indoor Championships and won another gold medal at the 2008 African Championships.

Competition record

References

References

1982 births
Living people
South African female long jumpers
South African heptathletes
Athletes (track and field) at the 2004 Summer Olympics
Olympic athletes of South Africa
Athletes (track and field) at the 2006 Commonwealth Games
Commonwealth Games competitors for South Africa
Sportspeople from Cape Town
African Games gold medalists for South Africa
African Games medalists in athletics (track and field)
Athletes (track and field) at the 2007 All-Africa Games